Adele One Night Only is a television special by English singer Adele. The 88-minute program aired on CBS, and simulcast on Paramount+, on 14 November 2021. It features Adele's performances of previously-unheard songs from her fourth studio album, 30 (2021), as well as previously released material, interspersed with an interview with Oprah Winfrey.

The special drew favourable reviews from critics, who praised Adele's voice and performing skills and the choice of the Griffith Observatory as the venue, but some criticised the interview segment. It became the most-viewed entertainment special in the United States since Oprah with Meghan and Harry (2021). The special won five awards from five nominations at the 74th Primetime Creative Arts Emmy Awards, a Directors Guild of America Award, and earned a nomination for the Grammy Award for Best Music Film at the 65th ceremony.

Background
Adele announced her fourth studio album, 30, on 13 October 2021, and confirmed it would be released on 19 November 2021. On the day following the announcement, "Easy on Me" was released as the lead single from the album. About the prospect of touring in support of 30, she stated: "This album? No, probably not. I'd love to. I was actually desperate to tour, which for me is wild because I don't like touring. [...] It doesn't sit right with me putting an album out this year and then touring it in 2023."

On 18 October, Adele announced that she would star in a television special for CBS, titled Adele One Night Only, which would be filmed during her show in Los Angeles on 14 November and broadcast live on Paramount+. It would feature an interview with Oprah Winfrey and the premiere of unreleased songs from the album. A trailer for the special was aired on 10 November, which featured her performing for a crowd including Lizzo, Dwyane Wade, and Gabrielle Union. Adele described it: "It will look really elegant, then I'll tell a load of filthy jokes and stand-up. It will be real whip lash for 'em." Regarding her decision to be part of the special, Winfrey stated that "nobody's more compelling with truth than Adele", and went on to promise viewers a "very special night".

Synopsis
The special was divided into two parts: a live concert filmed at the Griffith Observatory in Los Angeles, and Adele's interview with Winfrey in a separate location. Afront a sunset and a view of the Hollywood Hills, Adele opened her show with a performance of "Hello" (2015). The camera frequently cut to celebrites in attendance, whom Adele described as "a mix of close friends and complete strangers". She was dressed in a "floor-length, form-fitting, off-the-shoulder black dress", and dangly earrings. Adele frequently engaged in banter and interacted with the audience, occasionally using profanity which was beeped using a three-second delay. The show also included a male attendee proposing to his partner of seven years. Adele explained this to the audience and instructed them to be quiet, as the man walked the blindfolded woman to the front and tearfully proposed to her, after which Adele segued into a performance of "Make You Feel My Love". Adele also performed the then-unreleased tracks "I Drink Wine", "Hold On", and "Love Is a Game", along with the first performance of "Easy on Me".

The interview was filmed at Winfrey's home in Montecito, California, in a garden reminiscent of the one where she had interviewed Prince Harry, Duke of Sussex and Meghan, Duchess of Sussex earlier in the year. During this segment, Adele was asked about her upbringing, weight loss, as well as the current status of her love life. She was clad in a white pantsuit, which was originally a skirt suit that Adele asked to be altered. Vanessa Friedman of The New York Times, who thought a white pantsuit was "the single garment most associated with women's liberation and empowerment on the public stage", interpreted this outfit as a political message. Adele discussed her relationship with her estranged father, how it was important for her to heal her relationship with him before he passed away, the moment she knew her marriage was over, her relationship with Rich Paul, and other personal topics.

Reception

Ratings
In the United States, the special had 9.92 million primetime viewers and a 1.5 rating in the adult age 18-49 demographic. Its Live+same day count added a viewership of 1.3 million, surpassing the 93rd Academy Awards in April 2021, and making it the most-viewed entertainment special since CBS's Oprah with Meghan and Harry (2021). The viewership for the special's global broadcasts included 2.004 million from Canada, 797.000 from the Netherlands, 747.000 from Australia, 738.000 from Spain, 568.000 from France, 140.387 from Hungary, and 20.000 from Switzerland.

Critical response

Adele One Night Only received rave reviews according to Varietys Cynthia Littleton. At Metacritic, which assigns a normalized rating out of 100 to reviews from mainstream critics, the special has an average score of 69 out of 100, which indicates "generally favorable reviews" based on five reviews. Caroline Framke of Variety believed that though the views of the observatory were stunning, their impact was greatly enhanced by Adele's vocal performance: "She reminded the world why she's become such an icon, in a purer sense of the word than corporate Twitter accounts now use it. No amount of talking through or around her trials or process could quite equal the emotional punch of a clear-eyed Adele simply singing about it all". Writing for Vulture, Jen Chaney thought it occupied a "rarefied air" due to its massive production value, but Adele's voice and performing ability powered through it and reminded listeners why they missed her. Mary Siroky of Consequence belived the event was "gorgeously staged", and she was positive about the performances: "From the first notes of 'Hello,' it became very clear: Adele is not here to play".

Los Angeles Timess Lorraine Ali described the interview as "uneventful and distinctly nonrevealing", but he was positive about the proposal during the show and thought Adele's interaction with her son onstage displayed the most vulnerability. Ed Power of The Telegraph shared a similar opinion, and wrote that she was "an enigma who refused to be unlocked" and held back during the interview, but he praised the performances and the observatory as the location of choice. Writing for The A.V. Club, Lily Moayeri believed the constant switching between the interview and performance demanded "too much of a mood swing from viewers", but she appreciated Adele's charisma and the musical segment.

Set list
 "Hello"
 "Easy on Me"
 "Skyfall"
 "I Drink Wine"
 "Someone like You"
 "When We Were Young"
 "Make You Feel My Love"
 "Hold On"
 "Rolling in the Deep"
 "Love Is a Game"

Broadcasting

Awards and nominations

See also
 Adele at the BBC
 Adele Live in New York City

References

External links
 

2021 in American television
2021 in music
2021 television specials
Adele
2020s American television specials
CBS television specials
Concert films
Primetime Emmy Award-winning broadcasts
Oprah Winfrey